Edward Phillip Harrington (28 September 1895 – 28 May 1966) was an Australian poet and short story writer, the last of the bush balladists.

Born in Shepparton, in central Victoria, Harrington was the fourth child of Philip Harrington, a farmer from Ireland, and his Australian wife, Margaret O'Brien. Edward Harrington served in Palestine with the Australian Light Horse during the First World War, and took part in the charge on Beersheba.  He was discharged in 1919 with a repatriation pension, as he needed medical attention for the rest of his life. Harrington was a founding member of the Australian Poetry Lovers' Society (1934) and the Bread and Cheese Club (1938). He is generally referred to as the last of the Bush Balladists.

Notes

1895 births
1966 deaths
People from Shepparton
Australian male short story writers
20th-century Australian poets
Australian male poets
20th-century Australian short story writers
Australian military personnel of World War I
Place of death missing
20th-century Australian male writers